Caloocan's 1st congressional district, also known as North Caloocan district, is one of the three congressional districts of the Philippines in the city of Caloocan. It has been represented in the House of Representatives of the Philippines since 1987. The district consists mostly of the North Caloocan barangays north of EDSA and Circumferential Road 4: Barangays 1 to 4 of Zone 1, Barangays 77 to 85 in Zones 7 and 8, and Barangays 132 to 177 in Zones 12 to 15. It is currently represented in the 19th Congress by Oscar Malapitan of the Nacionalista Party (NP).

In 2021, Barangays 178 to 188, which were part of the first district since its creation, have been separated from the district to form the third legislative district of Caloocan by virtue of Republic Act No. 11545.

Representation history

Election results

2022

2019

2016

2013

2010

See also
Legislative districts of Caloocan

References

Congressional districts of the Philippines
Politics of Caloocan
1987 establishments in the Philippines
Congressional districts of Metro Manila
Constituencies established in 1987